Arabesk may refer to:

Arabesk (Turkish music)
Arabesk Airline Alliance
Arabesk trilogy, a sequence of alternate history novels by the British author Jon Courtenay Grimwood
Arabesk (film), a 1989 Turkish comedy film

See also
Arabesque (disambiguation)